The 1982 Nebraska Cornhuskers football team represented the University of Nebraska–Lincoln in the 1982 NCAA Division I-A football season. The team was coached by Tom Osborne and played their home games in Memorial Stadium in Lincoln, Nebraska.

Schedule

Roster

Depth chart

Coaching staff

Game summaries

Iowa

Defending Big Ten Champion Iowa was down 28-0 by halftime, and was only able to muster a single 4th-quarter touchdown against Nebraska reserves to avoid the shutout.

New Mexico State

Records fell all over as Nebraska steamrolled New Mexico State 68-0 in Lincoln.  Nebraska's total of 883 offensive yards, 645 consecutive yards without going backwards, 36 rushing first downs, and 43 total first downs were all new NCAA records.

Penn State

Nebraska fought back from a 7-21 deficit and finally pulled into the lead on an 80-yard drive with 1:18 remaining, yet the Nittany Lions drove right back and handed the Cornhuskers their first and only loss of the season, keyed by a controversial Penn State completion at the sideline, leaving 9 seconds left on the clock.  Sixteen years later, Penn State TE Mike McCloskey, the receiver of the controversial catch, admitted he was out of bounds on the play and should have been ruled incomplete. Because the McCloskey "catch" stood, quarterback Todd Blackledge subsequently tossed the game winning catch to Kirk Bowman with 4 seconds remaining.

Auburn

The Cornhuskers, demoralized from the loss to Penn State a week earlier, struggled to come to life as Nebraska entered the locker room at halftime with a narrow 14-7 lead.  By the end of the 3rd quarter, Nebraska had tacked on another 7 points, while Auburn had turned over the ball three times, and Nebraska finally ran off three straight scores in the 4th to put it away.

Colorado

Nebraska LB Steve Damkroger only recorded two interceptions during his Nebraska career, both in this game, as new Colorado coach Bill McCartney had his Colorado Buffaloes gunning for Nebraska through his attempt to establish the Cornhuskers as their main rival to give his squad a target by which to measure their success.  At one point, Colorado came within 6 points of the lead, but Damkroger's two interceptions helped put to bed any Colorado upset hopes as Nebraska posted 20 unanswered 4th quarter points for the easy win.

Kansas State

Nebraska IB Mike Rozier became the second Nebraska back, after I.M. Hipp, to play back-to-back 200 yard games, and Cornhusker QB Turner Gill set a new Big 8 completion percentage record of 91.7%, as Nebraska had little trouble with Kansas State in Lincoln.

Missouri

Missouri was sniffing an upset after Nebraska QB Turner Gill was forced out by an injury in the 2nd quarter as the Tigers led 7-6, and the pressure was mounting after the Cornhuskers fell behind 9-13 in the 4th quarter, but backup QB Bruce Mathison directed two touchdown drives with help from an interception by Nebraska LB Brent Evans, and although Missouri would score again, the 10-point lead with 2:36 to go was too much for the Tigers to overcome.

Kansas

Nebraska cruised to their 14th win in a row over Kansas and their 2nd shutout of the season, piling up 546 yards of offense compared to 69 for the Jayhawks and giving up only one turnover while owning the ball for 34:27.  Five different players recorded touchdowns, as the Cornhuskers set out to protest their drop in the poll from #5 to #6 and prove that the previous close call in Missouri was not to be the norm.

Oklahoma State

Oklahoma State runner Ernest Anderson, who later became the NCAA rushing record holder, was held to just 68 yards, while Nebraska IB Mike Rozier broke the Nebraska single season rushing record, held by Bobby Reynolds since 1950, with his 251-yard performance.  The Cornhuskers jumped out to a 21-point lead, and the Cowboys only came within 14 before Nebraska left them behind.

Iowa State

Iowa State briefly held Nebraska to just a 7-point lead, long enough for the Cyclones to post a tying score at the end of the 1st quarter, but the Cornhusker offense proved to be impossible to hold back as Nebraska then ran off 28 unanswered points.  Iowa State feebly posted a field goal in the 4th quarter, which Nebraska then punctuated with another 13 points to put this one away.

Oklahoma

A hard-fought, statistically matched game of football powerhouses, Nebraska and Oklahoma traded the lead a few times before both offenses ground to a halt at the end of the 3rd quarter with the Cornhuskers clinging to a 4-point lead.  Two 4th quarter Sooner drives crossed Nebraska's 35-yard line without producing points, yet the game remained in doubt until Nebraska DE Scott Strasburger intercepted Oklahoma with 26 seconds left to play and ended the Sooners' hopes for the upset.

Hawaii

Few, if any, could have predicted that unranked Hawaii would lead Nebraska 10-0 by halftime and 16-7 at the end of the 3rd quarter, but the Cornhuskers finally found their footing late in this rare, late-season non-conference game and ripped 30 straight unanswered points in the 4th quarter, amassing 479 rushing yards on the day, to escape Honolulu with a 37-16 win.

LSU

Nebraska struggled to overcome six turnovers in a game that saw them behind 7-14 at the half, behind 17-14 by the end of the 3rd, and clinging to a 1-point lead after LSU was forced to settle for a field goal in the 4th.  Nebraska only punted once compared to the Tigers' six punts, had nearly double the total offensive yards, and a dominating rushing yardage lead, but the LSU ownership of the turnover battle demonstrated the importance of not giving away the ball as Nebraska barely escaped with the win.

Rankings

Awards

NFL and pro players
The following Nebraska players who participated in the 1982 season later moved on to the next level and joined a professional or semi-pro team as draftees or free agents.

References

Nebraska
Nebraska Cornhuskers football seasons
Big Eight Conference football champion seasons
Orange Bowl champion seasons
Nebraska Cornhuskers football